John Witherspoon (1723–1794) was a Founding Father of the United States.

John Witherspoon may also refer to:
 John Witherspoon (actor) (1942–2019), American actor
 John G. Witherspoon (1939-1994), American sailor